The Chitina River (Ahtna Athabascan Tsedi Na’  < tsedi "copper" + na’ "river") is a  tributary of the Copper River in the U.S. state of Alaska.  It begins in the Saint Elias Mountains at the base of Chitina Glacier and flows generally northwest through the Wrangell–St. Elias National Park and Preserve to meet the smaller river near Chitina. The watershed was once a major copper mining region.

Recreation
The Chitina River is suitable for floating in rafts, kayaks, and decked canoes by boaters with sufficient wilderness and whitewater skills. From a put-in place near Hubert's Landing, slightly downstream of Chitina Glacier, the river is Class II (medium) on the International Scale of River Difficulty all the way to the mouth at Chitina.

Boaters starting from Hubert's Landing will have to make a difficult  portage to reach the main river channel. It is also possible to put in at Jake's Bar, about halfway between the glacier and the river mouth. The shorter trip requires no portage.
  
Hazards include cold silty water, bad weather, and the remote location. Grizzlies pose a danger to boaters, especially near the mouths of clear tributaries, where the bears tend to congregate. A variety of salmon, attractive to bears, migrate to and from these tributaries.

Tributaries
The most important tributaries of the Chitina are from the north and emanate principally from the south slope of the Wrangell Mountains; in order downstream they are Nizina, Lakina, Gilahina, and Kuskulana rivers. From the south the main affluents are the Tana, Chakina, and Tebay rivers, which rise in the Chugach Mountains. Kiagna River is also a southern tributary of Chitina River.

The Tebay River, and an associated set of lakes and smaller streams in the Tebay watershed, offer "the potential for some of the finest wilderness angling experiences to be had in Southcentral Alaska", according to Alaska Fishing. The main game fish in the Tebay system are rainbow trout, lake trout, and Arctic grayling.

Gallery

See also

 List of rivers of Alaska

References

External links
 

Ahtna
Rivers of Alaska
Rivers of Copper River Census Area, Alaska
Rivers of Unorganized Borough, Alaska